The Crewe Chronicle, originally known as the Crewe and  Nantwich Chronicle, is a UK weekly newspaper first published on 21 March 1874. It was founded by the editor of the Chester Chronicle as a Radical alternative to the Tory-biased Crewe Guardian.

Now owned by Trinity Mirror, the Crewe Chronicle is published in a tabloid format every Wednesday and has a cover price of 82p. As of June 2012 the newspaper's circulation was 12,928.

References

Citations

Bibliography

External links

Newspapers published in Cheshire
Weekly newspapers published in the United Kingdom